Rhectosemia antofagastalis is a moth in the family Crambidae. It was described by Eugene G. Munroe in 1959. It is found in Chile.

References

Spilomelinae
Moths described in 1959
Endemic fauna of Chile